João Carlos Almeida (born 5 April 1988 in Lisbon) is a Portuguese track and field athlete who competes in the 110 metres hurdles. He competed in the event at the 2012 Summer Olympics, where he was eliminated in the first round after finishing sixth in his heat.

Competition record

References

External links
IAAF Profile.

1988 births
Living people
Athletes from Lisbon
Portuguese male hurdlers
Olympic athletes of Portugal
Athletes (track and field) at the 2012 Summer Olympics
S.L. Benfica athletes
Competitors at the 2011 Summer Universiade